Balai Pustaka (also spelled Balai Poestaka, both meaning "Bureau of Literature") is the state-owned publisher of Indonesia and publisher of major pieces of Indonesian literature such as Salah Asuhan, Sitti Nurbaya and Layar Terkembang. Its head office is in Jakarta.

Founded in 1917 as the Kantoor voor de Volkslectuur, Balai Pustaka was used by the Dutch colonial government as a means to control native Indonesians' access to information. After changing hands twice during the Indonesian war of independence, Balai Pustaka formally fell under the ownership of the Indonesian government.

History 
On 14 September 1908 the Dutch colonial government established the Commission for People's Education and Reading, later shortened to the Commission for People's Reading. Along with the foundation of Boedi Oetomo, it served to bring formal education to native Indonesians.

At the time, numerous free presses existed, publishing work in either bazaar or Chinese Malay. These works were outside of the control of colonial government and considered harmful to public morals. To provide "reading suitable for native Indonesians," the commission was formalised as the Office for People's Reading in 1917. In 1918 it was renamed Balai Pustaka.

At first Balai Pustaka released Malay translations of popular novels from the West, including The Adventures of Tom Sawyer, The Last of the Mohicans, and Sans Famille. It also published original, Malay-language short stories such as Penghibur Hati. With the publication of Azab dan Sengsara in 1920, Balai Pustaka began publishing original novels.

During this time Balai Bahasa practised strict censorship. Works such as Salah Asuhan were blocked from publication until they fulfilled the publisher's demands. It also required the use of formal Malay for works in that language; this requirement led to a disproportionate number of Sumatran writers being published.

During World War II and the Indonesian war of independence, control of Balai Pustaka changed hands twice. After the Dutch surrendered, the Japanese gave control of Balai Pustaka over to the native Indonesians. It was later retaken by the Dutch in July 1947, and then formally returned to Indonesian control in 1949 when the Dutch formally acknowledged Indonesia's independence.

Currently, Balai Bahasa is a state-owned publisher. Aside from publishing books, it also prints the national exams for senior high, vocational, and junior high schools.

Balai Pustaka period 

The early years of Balai Pustaka, from the publication of Azab and Sengsara in 1920 until 1933 when Poedjangga Baroe was first published, to be the first period in the development of modern Indonesian literature. It is called either the Balai Pustaka period or the 20s period. Aside from that, researchers and critics of Indonesian literature conventionally consider the formation of Balai Pustaka and publishing of Azab dan Sengsara as the beginning of modern Indonesian novel. Aside from that, some critics such as H. B. Jassin consider the publication of Azab dan Sengsara to be the birth of modern Indonesian literature.

Among the themes common to works published in the Balai Pustaka period are arranged marriage, conflict between the younger and older generations, and conflict between Western culture and traditional values. The diction is standardised, not dependent on the author.

Criticism 
Balai Pustaka under the Dutch colonial government was criticised for its language policy and censorship. The forced use of formal Malay has been called "language politics, ... used to divide the Indonesian people on ethnic lines."

Notable publications

Novels

Notes

References 

Sources

Further reading
  A. Teeuw, "The impact of Balai Pustaka on modern Indonesian literature", Bulletin of the School of Oriental and African Studies, University of London, Vol. XXXV, Part 1, 1972 (pp. 111-127).
 Bunga rampai kenangan pada Balai Pustaka, Jakarta: Balai Pustaka, 1992 - "volume commemorating the 75th anniversary of Balai Pustaka".
 Elizabeth B. Fitzpatrick, "Blai Pustaka in the Dutch East Indies: Colonizing a Literature", in: Sherry Simon and Paul St-Pierre, eds., Changing the Terms: Translating in the Postcolonial Era, University of Ottawa Press, 2000 (Perspectives on Translation).

External links 
  (Indonesian)
 Balai Pustaka - the early history of the company

Book publishing companies of Indonesia
Government-owned companies of Indonesia
Publishing companies established in 1917
1917 establishments in the Dutch East Indies